Domingo Terán de los Ríos served as the first governor of Texas from 1691 to 1692. He also governed Coahuila, in the modern-day Mexico.

Previous service
Terán served the Spanish crown in Peru for two decades.  He came to Mexico in 1681 as a deputy of the consulado of Sevilla. He was appointed governor of the province of Sonora y Sinaloa in 1686, and served in that position for approximately five years.  As governor,  he successfully developed a mining industry and pacified the Native Americans in that area.

Coahuila and Tejas
Terán was appointed governor on January 23, 1691, by Viceroy Gaspar de la Cerda, 8th Count of Galve. He was appointed to oversee the administration of Coahuila, Texas and adjacent regions. His role as governor was to set up seven missions among the Tejas Indians; to seek and remove any foreigners that may have settled in Spanish territory; and to catalog the land, the natural resources, and the peoples of the area.

Terán and his company departed on their trek on May 16, 1691, from Monclova, crossed the Rio Grande on May 28, and had reached the Red River by December of that year. When they reached San Francisco de los Tejas, de los Ríos renamed the region Nuevo Reyno de la Montaña de Santander y Santillana.

On June 13, 1691, Terán and his company camped at a rancheria on a stream called Yanaguana . They renamed the stream "San Antonio" because it was Saint Anthony's Day. Father Damian Massanet accompanied Terán on his trip.

On his journey northward, Terán met with Gregorio de Salinas Varona at the site of the French Fort Saint Louis, which had been abandoned after colonists died from disease and a Karankawa Indian attack. He was given new orders to explore the Tejas settlements in eastern Tejas.

When Terán was travelling southward, he met Juan Enríquez Barroto at Matagorda Bay on March 5, 1692, who relayed orders from the viceroy to explore the lower Mississippi River area.  Terán followed orders, but was prevented from completing them by bad weather.  He and his company returned to Veracruz on April 15. Terán's expedition failed to establish any missions among the Tejas. In his report, he defended his actions and explained the negative situation which he saw in East Texas.

References

External links
 "Domingo Terán de los Ríos," Sons of DeWitt Colony, Texas.
 Texas State Historical Association

Governors of Coahuila
Governors of Spanish Texas
Governors of Sinaloa
Governors of Sonora
Year of birth missing
Year of death missing
Spanish colonial governors and administrators
1680s in Mexico
1690s in Mexico
1690s in Texas